Somoto Canyon National Monument (Spanish: Monumento Nacional Cañón de Somoto) is a canyon located in the Madriz Department of Nicaragua.

The confluence of the Tapacalí and Comali Rivers at the head of the canyon form the Coco River, which flows through the canyon and onward  to the Caribbean Sea.

The Somoto Canyon was declared a national monument on November 29, 2006. The Somoto Canyon National Monument comprises one of 78 protected areas of Nicaragua and is managed by Ministry of the Environment and Natural Resources (MARENA).

History
The Somoto Canyon had not been explored systematically until a group of scientists from the Czech Republic and Nicaragua (INETER) "discovered" the canyon in 2004. The canyon is believed to have formed 5 to 13 million years ago during the Miocene period. After its discovery in 2004, the Somoto Canyon has been developing into a tourist attraction, further helping the growth of tourism in Nicaragua. However, this has also had a negative effect with incidents such as graffiti being written on the walls of the Canyon since its discovery. MARENA and INETER send technicians to clean and repair the vandalism.

See also
 Somoto
 Tourism in Nicaragua

References

External links
 Cañón de Somoto

Protected areas of Nicaragua
Landforms of Nicaragua
Madriz Department
Canyons and gorges of North America
Central American pine–oak forests